The Kimberley grunter (Syncomistes kimberleyensis) is a species of fish in the family Terapontidae. It is endemic to Australia, where it lives in the coastal rivers of northern Western Australia. It is known from the Durack, Pentecost, and Bow Rivers of the Kimberley region.

It is a herbivorous fish that feeds in filamentous algae, and is found in rocky pools and on the edges of watercourses where there is aquatic vegetation over sandy and rocky substrates.

References

Kimberley grunter
Kimberley (Western Australia)
Freshwater fish of Western Australia
Endemic fauna of Australia
Kimberley grunter
Taxonomy articles created by Polbot